Pradeep Sarkar (born 30 April 1955) is a writer and director who works in Bollywood. He began his career with Vinod Chopra Productions, the production company of director and producer Vidhu Vinod Chopra.

Personal life 
From a young boy listening to his father ask him if painting billboards is what he wants to do for a living, to helming a successful, full-fledged production house, it's been a long journey for Pradeep Sarkar.

Recipient of the prestigious Abby Award, Rapa Award and the National Film Award, Pradeep began his journey from Delhi College of Art graduating with a gold medal in 1979. After a 17-year stint in mainstream advertising as Creative Director - Art, he began his directorial journey as an acclaimed ad-film maker by unleashing his production house onto the advertising circles of Delhi.

Career 
Pradeep's production house shot out highly successful commercials; Tata Yellow Pages, ICICI Prudential, and Onida KY Thunder to name a few. The Aaj Tak TV commercials, shot in Black and White, apart from winning him the Rapa, also won him the Best Director of the Year Award at the Abby's.

Apart from commercials, Pradeep's also one of the most sought-after and prolific music video directors around. Shubha Mudgal's 'Ab Ke Saawan', Euphoria's 'Dhoom Pichak Dhoom' and 'Maaeri', Sultan Khan's "Piya Basanti" and Bhupen Hazarika's ‘Ganga’ went on to become benchmarks of excellence in visual appeal and storytelling.

After a string of music videos, feature film songs and over 1000 commercials, his foray into feature films produced the critically acclaimed Parineeta, winning him the acclaimed National Film Award in the Best Debut Film of a Director category. The film was highly acclaimed as an emotional, visual and musical extravaganza and accrued the maximum number of nominations in award ceremonies across the country at the time.

Pradeep also won the "Best Debutant Director‟ in Screen Awards and the "Hottest Young Director‟ in Stardust Awards in 2006. Parineeta also went on to win 5 Filmfare Awards.

His next three feature films were Laaga Chunari Mein Daag, Lafangey Parindey, and Mardaani all of which have been produced by Yash Raj Films His latest, Eela, starring Kajol, was produced by Ajay Devgn Films and was released in October 2018.

Pradeep continues to make ads and feature films and is a man with simple wants. His heart's greatest desires are creating fabulous work, finding fascinating props, and a large plate of homemade kosha maangsho.

Filmography

Web series

Awards and nominations

References

External links

 
 When Parineeta's director nearly lost it
 India's Best Films: Pradeep Sarkar
 Interview

Hindi-language film directors
Indian art directors
Indian male screenwriters
Bengali people
1955 births
Living people
Indian advertising directors
Film directors from Kolkata
21st-century Indian film directors
Director whose film won the Best Debut Feature Film National Film Award